Şarköy, previously known by its Greek name Περίσταση (Peristasi), is a seaside town and district of Tekirdağ Province situated on the north coast of the Marmara Sea in Thrace in Turkey. Şarköy is 86 km west of the town of Tekirdağ, and can be reached either by the inland road or by the winding coast road, which goes on to Gallipoli. The mayor is Alpay Var (CHP).

History
Stone-age weapons and implements have been found in the villages of Kızılca Terzi, Fener Karadutlar and Sofuköy. Bronze Age artefacts from 1200BC have been found in İğde Bağları (Araplı), showing that mining took place here and also that there were trading links between Thrace and the Aegean coast.

Greek colonies were founded from 750 to 550 BC with the agreement of the local Thracians. The Greek villages of Heraklea (Eriklice), Chóra (Hoşköy), Gános (Ganoz), Byzanthe-Panion (Barbaros) later fell into the hands of the Romans. Then under Byzantine rule Thrace was subject to wave on wave of invaders coming via the Balkans; Huns, Slavs, Bulgars, the Crusaders. By this time the area was known as Tristatis, Peristasis and also Agorà.

Following the Ottoman invasion in 1362 the name of the city became 'Şehirköy' ('city-village') and later 'Şarköy'. The area was first invaded in 1356 by Süleyman Paşa, son of Orhangazi, the son of the founder of the Ottoman dynasty. It changed control a few times before coming under Ottoman control in 1362, and permanently after the fall of Constantinople, now Istanbul, in 1453.

In the Ottoman period this coastline thrived, growing produce to ship to Constantinople, wine production, and also making bricks and roof-tiles which were exported further afield.

Şarköy was a township (bucak) in Gelibolu sanjak and belonged to Kaptanpaşa vilayet at first. Gelibolu sanjak returning to Adrianople vilayet in 1864.

According to the Ottoman population statistics of 1914, the kaza of Şarköy had a total population of 16,613, consisting of 11.009 Greeks and 5.604 Muslims.

During the 20th century the Turkish authorities oppressed, persecuted and terrorized the Greek and other Christian population of the town and of the surrounding area and nearby towns, so as to compel them to flee. Towards the beginning of 1913, the authorities exacted from the inhabitants payment for the upkeep of the Turkish fleet. Also,  imposed further contribution from the Christians for the construction of Government buildings, a Turkish school, telephonic communications, national defence, etc. At the same time the most rigorous boycott was exercised, for the purpose to bring famine the dispersion to the Christian Communities. In addition,  the importation of provisions into the town was prohibited under the penalty of death and no communication between the town and the other communities was allowed, and as another precaution the boats were rendered useless by the removal of the oars.

The coast was occupied briefly by Bulgarian forces on December 22, 1912 during the Balkan Wars, and again in 1920–22 by Greek forces during the Greco-Turkish War, this time with the support of the local Greek and Armenian people. Şarköy was a district in Thrace province between 1922–1926 before returning to Tekirdağ province.

The area today
Şarköy and Mürefte are small country towns providing the surrounding villages with amenities such as medical care and high schools. 90% of the land is cultivated, vineyards and olive groves near the coast, with sunflowers, wheat, barley and tobacco inland.

Şarköy has the longest beach in Turkey, the 12th longest in the world, which was dirty but has been cleaned up now and in 2006 was awarded a blue flag. The district includes 60 km of coastline for tourism, fishing and prawn fishing. And it is possible to take a motorboat from here to Avşa or Marmara Island. With all this to offer Şarköy is naturally popular with holidaymakers from Istanbul. There are hotels and guest houses in the town of Şarköy, but not enough to fill the demand in summertime. There are also compounds of holiday flats for summer residents. The town has a little jetty and pretty narrow lanes. The night-life and cuisine of the towns are not top-class. Şarköy attracts Istanbul's Population coming on family holidays, because it is not so far from İstanbul away. There are bars and discos playing a variety of different musics, and places among the rocks for the young or young at heart to creep off and drink beer and Raki. And as this area thrives on wine-making and tourism people are pretty cool about life. Şarköy is a mecca for Windsurfing because it is Said that 7 types of winds are meeting together there. The young generation tend to migrate to Istanbul for study and careers. Uçmakdere village has a parasailing possibility between end of May and beginning of September.

The land behind the coast has the right micro-climate for vineyards and wine-making; Şarköy is known for its wine and holds a wine festival each autumn. Güler Sabancı has a winery here making a Cabernet Sauvignon called Gulor. And the olives are very good too.

There is also an institute of Trakya University here.

Agriculture
The coastline between Tekirdağ and Şarköy, particularly Uçmakdere, Şarköy and Mürefte, are important places for viticulture and winemaking. 22 of the 27 villages of Şarköy grow grape and produce wine. There are well-known wine producers in the region, including "Doluca", "Gülor", "Kutman", "Bağcı" and "Latif Aral". Other wine producers of the region is "Melen" in Hoşköy, Şarköy.

Places of interest
Great Mosque of Gazi Süleyman Pasha
Uçmakdere - (formerly 'Avdimo') 36 km from Şarköy, on a winding road along the cliffs from Tekirdağ. Uçmakdere is a lovely seaside village on a rocky coast with pretty wine-growing countryside behind. A wine making centre since the Byzantine period, Greek-built wineries still active today. Ruins of a Byzantine monastery, once silk was made here too. Partridge shooting on the steep hillside behind the village, and also great views.
Gaziköy  - 25 km from Şarköy, 2700 years of history including; fossils, ruined Byzantine houses and churches, the castle named 'Ganos'
Hoşköy - (formerly 'Hora') 16 km from Şarköy, another village with vineyards ('Melen' and others) and a long history
Eriklice - an old-established seaside fishing village with vineyards and olive groves
Mürefte  - (formerly 'Myrióphyton') - 13 km from Şarköy, an ancient tree-lined village on a lovely coastline, with views of Marmara Island across the sea. Wine-making and olive-growing. There are guest houses and restaurants for those looking for a weekend escape from Istanbul. Wine-making is a large-scale modern industry here now, well known grape varieties such as semillon and gamay are grown alongside the traditional local varieties for use in wineries including Kutman.

References

External links

Şarköy'ün web adresi - Şarköy Haber, Resim Video Portalı
Sarkoyunsesi.com - Voice of Şarköy
Sarkoy Bilgileri Portalı
Yerelnet.org.tr - Şarköy
SARKOY GUIDANCE - Şarköy
Local news homepage 
Otelcenneti Şarköy Otelleri

Towns in Turkey
Districts of Tekirdağ Province
Seaside resorts in Turkey
Populated places in Tekirdağ Province
Fishing communities in Turkey
Former Greek towns in Turkey
Populated coastal places in Turkey